The Tölzer Knabenchor (Tölz Boys' Choir) is a German boys' choir named after the Upper Bavarian city of Bad Tölz and since 1971 based in Munich.
The choir is ranked among the most versatile and sought-after boys' choirs in the world.

History 
Tölzer Knabenchor was founded in 1956 by the then 19-year-old grammar school graduate Gerhard Schmidt-Gaden in Bad Tölz. Already in the same year, it was invited to give radio concerts. In 1957 the first concert tour to South Tyrol and Trento followed, in 1960 a trip to Luxembourg, France, England and Belgium. Since 1963 Carl Orff was a regular guest and conductor. He recorded his Schulwerk with the choir. From the 1960s on, the choir and its members participated in opera performances. In 1964, for example, soloists from the choir participated for the first time in a performance of Mozart's Magic Flute.

Since 1971, the choir has rehearsed in the state capital of Munich.

In 1973, Gerhard Schmidt-Gaden and his choir received the German Record Prize for their performance of Johann Sebastian Bach's Christmas Oratorio. In 1984 and 1986, trips to Chicago, China and Japan followed. Since then, the choir has become known worldwide. In Japan, the choir boys are called Angels from Bavaria and are the subject of manga, among other books.

The choir has since made concert tours all over the world, including Japan, the People's Republic of China, Israel, Poland and the USA. It has sung at numerous festivals, including Bayreuth Festival, Berlin Festival, Bregenz Festival, Handel Festival Halle (Saale), Heinrich Schütz Festival Kassel, Ludwigsburg Castle Festival, Munich Opera Festival, Salzburg Festival, Schleswig-Holstein Music Festival, Schwetzingen Festival, Vienna Festival. Eminent artists such as Carl Orff, August Everding, Hans Werner Henze, Leonard Bernstein, Gustav Leonhardt, Nikolaus Harnoncourt, and Claudio Abbado count among the choir's supporters.

The choir sang at the opening ceremony of the 1972 Summer Olympics in the Olympic Stadium in Munich, directed by Carl Orff, during the traditional Salute of Youth, performed by 3,500 Munich schoolchildren, which made an enormous impression throughout the world. The choir also participated in the official opening ceremony for the 2006 World Cup in Germany on June 9, 2006 at the Allianz Arena in Munich, directed by Christian Stückl. It also sang on the tarmac at Munich Airport for the farewell of Pope Benedict XVI from his visit to Germany in September 2006, who was delighted to thank all the boys and the artistic director personally.

From 2009 to 2014, Ralf Ludewig was artistic director and managing director of the choir. In 2014, he was dismissed by Schmidt-Gaden right before the start of a tour of China due to serious disagreements about personnel management and artistic direction. From September 2014 to March 2021, vocal coaches Christian Fliegner and Clemens Haudum were the musical and artistic directors of the Tölzer Knabenchor. Both were longtime members of the staff around Schmidt-Gaden, who continued to pull the strings in his role as artistic mentor. Schmidt-Gaden's wife Helga Schmidt-Gaden took care of economic matters as before, while daughter Barbara Schmidt-Gaden joined as artistic and operational coordinator and has been the sole executive director since 2016. In May 2016, long-time choir manager Anselm Sibig was unexpectedly fired and replaced by Barbara Schmidt-Gaden, who took over his duties for only a short period of time.

In 2017, author Christopher Kloeble, who sang in the choir from 1988 to 1994, reported mental abuse by then-choir manager Gerhard Schmidt-Gaden. Another choirboy confirmed the atmosphere of fear, humiliation, and emotional violence, including slaps in the face, for that time. Gerhard Schmidt-Gaden and current executive director Barbara Schmidt-Gaden did not comment on the allegations.

After Clemens Haudum resigned his position as artistic director in March 2021, Christian Fliegner was the sole artistic director until June 2021, when Michael Hofstetter was introduced as the choir's new artistic director at the end of June 2021. Fliegner took over the newly created position of training director with the 2021/22 season. A year later - at the end of the 2021/22 season - the choir was again restructured. After one year, Michael Hofstetter left the Tölzer Knabenchor. According to a press release, the choir needed a director with a particularly intensive, regular teaching schedule. Hofstetter, however, could not provide this because of his other artistic commitments. Hofstetter will, however, remain with the choir as principal guest conductor and advisory board member of the sponsoring association. The succession of the artistic direction has not been settled for the time being.

Since 2014, the choir has hosted a boys' choir festival in Bad Tölz, featuring internationally renowned choirs such as the Vienna Boys' Choir, the Augsburg Cathedral Boys' Choir, the Zurich Boys' Choir, and the Wilten Boys' Choir.

Talent development and education in the choir 
The total choir consists of about 170 boys, who are trained in five individual choirs. Education starts at the age of six, each member receiving intensive solo vocal training in addition to weekly group rehearsals. The ensemble is composed of several choirs, divided according to age and musical level. Choir I, with the best and most experienced boys, is the concert choir. Choir II also performs in occasional public concerts. In it, the boys are prepared for concert maturity and for Choir I. Aptitude tests begin in the first grade at many schools in Munich and the surrounding area. The choir is not affiliated with a boarding school. The children are individually supported in choir and solo lessons, thus awakening their enthusiasm and passion for music. A total of ten choir directors and vocal pedagogues supervise the children. The training principle in the choir is that every single child is able to sing solo. For example, the choir is able to perform oratorios by Bach with a small cast.

Repertoire 
The repertoire covers vocal music from the medieval to the modern, folk music, madrigals and motets, church music from the baroque to the classical, solo roles and opera for children's choirs. Members of the choir have played the "Three boys" in Mozart's Die Zauberflöte (The Magic Flute) in numerous productions. 

Some of the choir's most popular recordings include
 Bach cantatas (notably the Teldec set with Nikolaus Harnoncourt and Gustav Leonhardt conducting)
 Bach's B minor mass (Robert King, cond./ Andrew Parrott, cond.)
 Bach's St John passion and Christmas Oratorio (Nikolaus Harnoncourt, Unitel/Deutsche Grammophon DVD)
 Bach's St Matthew passion (Gustav Leonhardt, cond.)
 Haydn's 'Creation' and masses (with Bruno Weil and the Canadian Tafelmusik Baroque Orchestra)
 Sacred works by Heinrich Schütz and Orlando di Lasso (Capriccio)
 Three boys in Mozart's "Magic flute" in recordings with Claudio Abbado, Bernard Haitink, Nikolaus Harnoncourt, Ivan Fischer, Herbert von Karajan, James Levine, Arnold Östman, Wolfgang Sawallisch, among others.

Discography 

 Mozart: Requiem in D minor, K. 626 (Chorus) with Bruno Weil (conductor) and Tafelmusik Baroque Orchestra; 2000 (Sony Classical)

References

External links
  
 Unofficial blog. (Spanish).
 Concerts Archive

Music in Munich
German choirs
Choirs of children
Boys' and men's choirs
Musical groups established in 1956
1956 establishments in West Germany